Vrontados is a small coastal town located at the eastern part of the island of Chios in Greece. With a population of about 5,300 the town hosts the seat of the municipality of Omiroupoli.

Information

The town has a strong tradition in merchant seafaring and is currently the home of various important Greek ship owners. Due to its proximity to the city of Chios (the island's capital), modern Vrontados is considered a sort of a suburb of the capital. Vrontados purportedly gets its name from the loud noise thunder (Vrontes - Βροντές) makes as it echoes from the nearby mountain, Aepos.

Customs

Vrontados is well known for its unique Easter celebration known as rouketopolemos (rocket war). Every Easter, the Eastern Orthodox churches, Agios Marcos and Erithiani, fire rockets at each other (Rouketopolemos). Whoever hits the other church's bell tower first wins the war.

Historical References
The legendary Poet Homer was supposedly born or at least lived for a long time in Chios. On the north side of the Vrontados coast is the so-called "Homer's stone", a rather uncomfortable natural rock throne where according to the legend the poet sang and taught.

According to tradition, Christopher Columbus, visited Vrontados in order to study nautical charts and get information of experienced Vrondadian seamen who would help him to his great voyage for the discovery of America.

Notable natives and inhabitants
 Stamatios Krimigis (1938) space scientist

External links
Chiosnet: An article in Chios Travel Guide
Municipality of Homeroupolis: Another article containing some photos.

See also
 List of settlements in the Chios regional unit

Notes

Populated places in Chios